The men's 3 metre springboard, also reported as springboard diving, was one of four diving events on the Diving at the 1968 Summer Olympics programme. It was the 13th appearance of the event, which has been held at every Olympic Games since the 1908 Summer Olympics.

Competition format
The competition was split into two phases:

Preliminary round (19–20 October)
Divers performed five compulsory dives with limited degrees of difficulty and two voluntary dives without limits. The twelve divers with the highest scores advanced to the final.
Final (20 October)
Divers performed three voluntary dives without limit of degrees of difficulty. The final ranking was determined by the combined score with the preliminary round.

Schedule 
All times are Central Time Zone (UTC-6)

Results

References

Sources
 

Men
1968
Men's events at the 1968 Summer Olympics